The Danish Super Cup was played for by the Danish League champions and the Danish Cup Winners.

Winners
1994  :  Brøndby IF   4-0  Silkeborg IF
1995  :  F.C. Copenhagen   2-1  Aalborg BK
1996  :  Brøndby IF     4-0  AGF
1997  :  Brøndby IF     2-0  F.C. Copenhagen
1998   not played
1999  :  AB             2-2  Aalborg BK                [AB on pen]
2000  :  Viborg FF      1-1  Herfølge BK          [Viborg on pen]
2001  :  F.C. Copenhagen   2-0  Silkeborg IF
2002  :  Brøndby IF     1-0  Odense BK
2003  not played
2004  :  F.C. Copenhagen   2-1  Aalborg BK

Total titles

References

Supercup
Defunct national association football supercups